Joshua Bruce (born 8 June 1992) is a professional Australian rules footballer playing for the Western Bulldogs in the Australian Football League (AFL). He previously played for the Greater Western Sydney Giants between 2012 and 2013 and the St Kilda Saints between 2014 and 2019. Bruce was St Kilda's leading goalkicker in 2015 and the Western Bulldogs' leading goalkicker in 2021.

Early life
Bruce was born in Canberra, Australian Capital Territory and attended St Edmund's College and Canberra Grammar School. Bruce played junior football for the Eastlake Football Club in the AFL Canberra competition.  drafted Bruce as an ACT zone selection to play with their TAC Cup team in 2010. He continued to play with the Giants in 2011 while the club was competing in the North East Australian Football League (NEAFL).

AFL career

Greater Western Sydney (2012–2013)
Bruce played just the three games in his debut season, kicking two goals. Bruce played in eleven games for just the one win in 2013, playing mostly as a key defender.

St Kilda (2014–2019)

Bruce played his first game for St Kilda in round 5, 2014 against . While quiet initially, he was tried as a forward in round 19 against . After a three-goal display, his next pre-season was spent training with the forwards. He went on to become St Kilda's leading goalkicker for 2015, kicking 50 goals and finishing eighth in that year's Coleman Medal tally. Bruce had a similarly consistent year in 2016; though he kicked less goals for the year, this still included another five-goal haul against Essendon. Bruce's output dropped slightly in the first half of the 2017 season, and he was dropped for the first time since 2014, having played every game in 2015–2016. Upon his return to the senior team, he kicked four goals against Adelaide and had an improved finish to the year.

At the conclusion of the 2019 season Bruce requested a trade to the Western Bulldogs. He was traded on 16 October.

Western Bulldogs (2020–)
After a mediocre 2020 AFL season, Bruce stamped his credentials as one of the competition's menacing key forwards when he kicked 10 goals against  in the 3rd round of the 2021 AFL season. Bruce enjoyed a consistent year in 2021, kicking 48 goals in 20 matches before his season was cut short by an ACL rupture.

Statistics
Statistics are correct to the end of round 3 2021.

|- style="background-color:#EAEAEA"
! scope="row" style="text-align:center" | 2012
| 
| 47 || 3 || 2 || 1 || 16 || 17 || 33 || 12 || 2 || 0.7 || 0.3 || 5.3 || 5.7 || 11.0 || 4.0 || 0.7
|-
! scope="row" style="text-align:center" | 2013
| 
| 47 || 11 || 1 || 0 || 85 || 47 || 132 || 46 || 27 || 0.1 || 0.0 || 7.7 || 4.3 || 12.0 || 4.2 || 2.5
|- style="background-color:#EAEAEA"
! scope="row" style="text-align:center" | 2014
| 
| 27 || 10 || 4 || 1 || 69 || 45 || 114 || 45 || 16 || 0.4 || 0.1 || 6.9 || 4.5 || 11.4 || 4.5 || 1.6
|-
! scope="row" style="text-align:center" | 2015
| 
| 27 || 22 || 50 || 24 || 165 || 75 || 240 || 110 || 56 || 2.3 || 1.1 || 7.5 || 3.4 || 10.9 || 5.0 || 2.5
|- style="background-color:#EAEAEA"
! scope="row" style="text-align:center" | 2016
| 
| 27 || 22 || 38 || 22 || 127 || 106 || 233 || 100 || 59 || 1.7 || 1.0 || 5.8 || 4.8 || 10.6 || 4.5 || 2.7
|-
! scope="row" style="text-align:center" | 2017
| 
| 27 || 20 || 36 || 27 || 143 || 94 || 237 || 104 || 41 || 1.8 || 1.4 || 7.2 || 4.7 || 11.9 || 5.2 || 2.1
|- style="background-color:#EAEAEA"
! scope="row" style="text-align:center" | 2018
| 
| 27 || 3 || 4 || 0 || 13 || 22 || 35 || 12 || 7 || 1.3 || 0.0 || 4.3 || 7.3 || 11.6 || 4.0 || 2.3
|-
! scope="row" style="text-align:center" | 2019
| 
| 27 || 22 || 36 || 20 || 151 || 109 || 260 || 96 || 40 || 1.6 || 0.9 || 6.7 || 5.0 || 11.8 || 4.4 || 1.8
|-
! scope="row" style="text-align:center" | 2020
| 
| 17 || 17 || 14 || 8 || 55 || 81 || 136 || 47 || 28 || 0.8 || 3.2 || 4.8 || 8.0 || 2.8 || 1.6 || 2.5
|-
! scope="row" style="text-align:center" | 2021
| 
| 17 || 20 || 48 || 21 || 138 || 28 || 221 || 100 || 26 || 4.7 || 0.7 || 11.3 || 3.7 || 15.0 || 8.7 || 1.0
|-style="background:#EAEAEA; font-weight:bold; width:2em"
| scope="row" text-align:center class="sortbottom" colspan=3 | Career
| 133
| 199
| 105
| 858
| 607
| 1465
| 598
| 278
| 1.5
| 0.8
| 6.5
| 4.6
| 11.0
| 4.5
| 2.1
|}

Notes

Honours and achievements

 Individual
 St Kilda leading goalkicker: 2015

Coaching
Bruce was appointed as the development coach of the Bulldogs' AFLW team in October 2021.

References

External links

1992 births
Living people
Greater Western Sydney Giants players
St Kilda Football Club players
Australian rules footballers from the Australian Capital Territory
Glenelg Football Club players
Flagstaff Hill Football Club players
People educated at Canberra Grammar School
Sandringham Football Club players
Western Bulldogs players